Turbonilla reticulata is a species of sea snail, a marine gastropod mollusk in the family Pyramidellidae, the pyrams and their allies.

Distribution
This species occurs in the following locations:
 Caribbean Sea
 Gulf of Mexico
 Jamaica
 Puerto Rico

References

External links
 To Biodiversity Heritage Library (14 publications)
 To Encyclopedia of Life
 To USNM Invertebrate Zoology Mollusca Collection
 To USNM Invertebrate Zoology Mollusca Collection
 To ITIS
 To World Register of Marine Species

reticulata
Gastropods described in 1850